Ohel Shem is an Israeli secular high school located in the city of Ramat Gan. It has about 1,550 students studying in 45 classes, from ninth to twelfth grade, and about 160 teachers and 40 staff.

The campus contains, in addition to the classrooms, a library, a community center (Eshkol Paiss) comprising an auditorium and chemistry, physics, biology, biotechnology and robotics laboratories, a gym, cafeterias, sports fields, lawns and trees.

Projects
The school has a newspaper, "Dugri", a website built by students only, theater productions, a students band, and a teachers band.

The school is part of the MUN project.

History
The school was founded as a private institution in 1934 by Dr. Alexander Kohler, who also founded the Gymnasia Balfour in Tel Aviv in 1931.
Until 1944 Ohel Shem included both primary and secondary education classes.

The school was located in a small building on a hill in Bialik Street until 1961 when it moved to its present location on Smadar Street.

Israel Artzi was the administrator and principal of the school until his death in 1978.
Between 1985 and 1978 the principal was Dr. Izi Cahane. Between 1989 and 1986 Mira Hemo ran the school followed by Dr. David Singer (1995–1990), Adam Kenigsberger (1996–2010).
The current principal is Shmuel Keynan (Reserve Brigadier General, ICT force chief from 2005 to 2008). In September 2005 Adam Kenigsberger was awarded the title of "excelling district principal".

Attitude towards religious activities
The secular Ohel Shem High School has denied its students permission to pray on school premises.

Famous Alumni
Listed alphabetically by surname.
 Yosef Ahimeir, Israeli journalist and former politician
 Menahem Ben, journalist
 Amir Eshel, Commander in Chief of the Israeli Air Force
 Yael S. Feldman, Professor Emerita of Hebrew Culture at New York University, NY. 
 Yoav Gelber, professor of history at the University of Haifa
 Jacob Golomb, professor of philosophy at the Hebrew University of Jerusalem
 Etgar Keret, writer
 Uzi Landau, Israeli politician
 Guy Loel, Israeli actor
 Dov Moran, Israeli engineer, inventor and businessman
 Itamar Rabinovich, Israel's ambassador to the United States from 1993 to 1996
 Judy Shalom Nir-Mozes, socialite
 Gil Shohat, composer, conductor and pianist
 Dov Weissglass, lawyer

External links
 Ohel Shem Official Website

High schools in Israel
Educational institutions established in 1934
1934 establishments in Mandatory Palestine
Buildings and structures in Ramat Gan